New York's 127th State Assembly district is one of the 150 districts in the New York State Assembly. It has been represented by Democrat Albert Stirpe Jr. since 2013, and between 2007 and 2010.

Geography
District 127 is in Onondaga County. It contains the towns of Cicero, Clay, Manlius, Pompey and Tully.

Recent election results

2022

2020

2018

2016

2014

2012

References 

127
Onondaga County, New York